Harjant Gill is an Indian documentary filmmaker and teaches visual anthropology at Towson University. His films explore topics related to gender, sexuality, religion and belonging in India and among Indians in diaspora.

Personal life
Gill was born in Chandigarh, India; grew up in the San Francisco Bay Area, California; and now lives in Washington, D.C.

Filmography
 Sent Away Boys (2016)
 Mardistan (documentary) (Macholand) (2014)
Roots of Love (2011)
Lot's Wife (2008)
Milind Soman Made Me Gay (2007)
Some Reasons For Living (2003)
Everything (2002)

References

External links
 

Film directors from Chandigarh
Living people
Towson University faculty
American film directors of Indian descent
Year of birth missing (living people)